Justine Priestley (born April 18, 1968) is a Canadian actress. She is actor Jason Priestley's sister, but not his twin as is often reported. She has appeared in movies and television series, including Melrose Place.

External links

1968 births
Canadian television actresses
Living people
Actresses from Vancouver
Bartenders